Kwasi Opoku-Amankwa is the director-general of Ghana Education Service and an associate professor.

Prior to his appointment to be the director-general of Ghana Education service, he was The dean of the International Programmes Office (IPO)  at Kwame Nkrumah University of Science And Technology (KNUST).

Early life and education 
He had his secondary education at Suhum Secondary Technical School and went to  Wesley College in Kumasi, for his professional post-secondary teacher certificate. His  first degree in  Social Sciences was from Kwame Nkrumah University Of Science And Technology (KNUST),  a Master of Arts and  Graduate Diploma in Communication Studies from the University of Ghana. His  PhD was on  language and education from the University of Reading in the UK.

References 

Living people
Kwame Nkrumah University of Science and Technology alumni
Ghanaian civil servants
University of Ghana alumni
Year of birth missing (living people)